Young Jesus is an American indie rock band from Chicago, Illinois. Since 2014, the band has been based out of Los Angeles, California.

History
Young Jesus began as a high school band in the Chicago suburbs, consisting of two members who are no longer in the band. While located in Chicago, there were two side projects featuring members of Young Jesus: Bummer and Wavepool. As of the release of their debut album Home, in 2012, the band featured Rossiter, along with bassist Shawn Nystrand, lead guitarist Cody Kellogg, and drummer Peter Martin. The only member of that lineup still in Young Jesus is Rossiter; Shevrin was a member of the band from 2015 until 2020  and Borbon and Haug were members since 2016.

Young Jesus released the full-length album Grow/Decompose on Gigantic Noise Records in 2015. In 2017, Young Jesus signed to Saddle Creek Records, where they have released three full length albums.

Musical style 
Young Jesus is not a Christian rock band, although they have been mistaken for one due to their name. The band is influenced by Midwest emo and jazz, and post-rock. Their lyrics are influenced by ancient Chinese poetry, specifically from the Chan Buddhist and Taoist tradition.

Discography
Studio albums
Home (2012, self-released)
Grow/Decompose (2015, Gigantic Noise)
S/T (2017, Saddle Creek)
The Whole Thing Is Just There (2018, Saddle Creek)
Welcome to Conceptual Beach (2020, Saddle Creek)
Shepherd Head (2022, Saddle Creek)

Extended Plays
Young, Innocent, & Hairy (2010, self-released)
Maybe Baby (2011, self-released)
Void as Lob (2016, Gigantic Noise)

References

Rock music groups from California
Saddle Creek Records artists